Ralph E. "Buckshot" O'Brien (April 8, 1928 – August 22, 2018) was an American professional basketball player.

A 5'9" point guard from Butler University, O'Brien played two seasons (1951–1953) in the National Basketball Association as a member of the Indianapolis Olympians and Baltimore Bullets. He averaged 7.1 points per game in his NBA career.

O'Brien was the last Butler product to appear in an NBA game for more than a half-century, before the 2010 arrival of Gordon Hayward.

See also
 List of shortest players in National Basketball Association history

References

1928 births
2018 deaths
American men's basketball players
Baltimore Bullets (1944–1954) players
Basketball players from Indianapolis
Basketball players from Kentucky
Butler Bulldogs men's basketball players
Indianapolis Olympians draft picks
Indianapolis Olympians players
People from Union County, Kentucky
Point guards